The Broad Front for Democracy was a Panamanian political party originally founded in 2013.

At the 2014 Panamanian general election, the candidate's party was Genaro López for the Presidency. At the legislative election, the party had 1.0% votes and no seats.

The party dissolved in 2014, was re-founded in 2018 and returned dissolved in 2019.

References 

Political parties disestablished in 2014
Political parties established in 2013
Political parties established in 2018
Political parties in Panama
Socialist parties in North America